Highway 981 is a provincial highway in the east central region of the Canadian province of Saskatchewan. It runs from Highway 980 until it transitions to Township Road 441. Highway 981 is about 22 km (14 mi) long.

Highway 981 lies entirely within the Porcupine Provincial Forest in the Porcupine Hills and provides access to Porcupine Hills Provincial Park.

See also
Roads in Saskatchewan
Transportation in Saskatchewan

References

981